Colonel George Bissland Moore (October 6, 1918 – July 4, 2014) was an American modern pentathlete who competed at the 1948 Summer Olympics in London, where he won a silver medal in that year's modern pentathlon competition. Born in St. Louis, Missouri, he graduated from the Lawrenceville School in Lawrenceville, New Jersey in 1936. He was a track and field athlete at the United States Military Academy prior to becoming involved in the modern pentathlon. He served during World War II and was injured, earning a Purple Heart, two Bronze Star Medals, and the Legion of Merit. He later taught at the United States Military Academy before retiring in 1965 to pursue computer management and educational administration. He worked at the Lawrenceville School, his alma mater, until the 1980s.

References

1918 births
2014 deaths
American pentathletes
American male modern pentathletes
Modern pentathletes at the 1948 Summer Olympics
Olympic silver medalists for the United States in modern pentathlon
Recipients of the Legion of Merit
Medalists at the 1948 Summer Olympics
Lawrenceville School alumni
20th-century American people